Séchan is a surname. Notable people with the surname include: 

Charles Séchan (1803–1874), French painter and theatre designer
Edmond Séchan (1919–2002), French cinematographer and film director
Lolita Séchan, French writer
Olivier Séchan (1911–2006), French writer
Thierry Séchan (1949–2019), French journalist and writer